The Piano Sonata in E-flat major, Hob. XVI/49, L.59, was written in 1789/90 by Joseph Haydn. It marked the beginning of Haydn's late, mature style with frequent use of alternation between staccato (mostly) and legato (often/sometimes). The transitions were much smoother compared to his early and middle works, with larger first and second movements, and a smaller third movement.

History

This sonata was written in 1789/90 for and dedicated to Maria Anna von Genzinger. It was published with the title: "Grande Sonate per il Fortepiano ... Op. 69 ...". The first and the third movement were written in 1789, as clearly written in Haydn's letters. The autograph is dated June 1, 1790, but that only applies to the newly composed Adagio, and perhaps the final revision of the whole.

The autograph indicated the dedicatee as: "per la stimatissima Signora Anna de Jerlischeck", but in the end, Haydn honored Maria Anna von Genzinger with the work. On July 11, Genzinger wrote to Haydn from Vienna that she liked the sonata "very much indeed", but she asked him to simplify for her that B-flat minor middle section in the Adagio where the left hand crosses over to the right. Haydn promised an altered version, but it has never come to light.

Structure

This work has three movements.

See also

List of solo piano compositions by Joseph Haydn

References

External links

, Alfred Brendel

Piano sonatas by Joseph Haydn
Compositions in E-flat major
1790 compositions